The Permanent Delegate of Peru to the United Nations Educational, Scientific and Cultural Organization is Peru's foremost diplomatic representative at the United Nations Educational, Scientific and Cultural Organization, and in charge of Peru's diplomatic mission to UNESCO.

List of representatives

See also
Permanent Representative of Peru to the Organization of American States
Permanent Representative of Peru to the United Nations
List of ambassadors of Peru to the European Union

References

UNESCO